Romain Martial (born 13 November 1984) is a French rugby union player. His position is Wing and he currently plays for Issoire in the Top 14. He began his career with RC Narbonne in the Pro D2, scoring 115 points in three seasons, before moving to Castres. He was the joint second top try scorer in the 2011–12 season, with 10 tries.

Honours

Club 
 Castres
Top 14: 2012–13

References

1984 births
Living people
French rugby union players
Sportspeople from Clermont-Ferrand
Castres Olympique players
Rugby union wings